CASMA, the Computerized Airline Sales and Marketing Association, was a non-profit industry association focusing on the distribution of airline products.  Its members included airlines, global distribution system (GDS) vendors, travel search companies, technology providers, and other experts in travel distribution. It was founded in 1994 and its last conference was held in 2013. Its last president was Mark Pond (2008-2014) and it closed in 2014.

CASMA sponsored two conferences yearly which attract airline sales and distribution staff, GDS/CRSs, flight search systems, and systems integrators, and where distribution strategies are presented and debated.

In conjunction with the International Air Transport Association (IATA), CASMA offered a training course, "CASMA University", starting with "Airline Distribution - An Introduction and Overview".

Notes

References
 
 Chicke Fitzgerald, Global Distribution Systems: Outlook for the 21st Century, p. 117

Airline trade associations
Organizations established in 1994
Organizations disestablished in 2014